The Jefferson disk, also called the Bazeries Cylinder or wheel cypher as named by Thomas Jefferson, is a cipher system using a set of wheels or disks, each with the 26 letters of the alphabet arranged around their edge. The order of the letters is different for each disk and is usually ordered randomly. Each disk is marked with a unique number and a hole in the center of the disks allows them to be stacked on an axle. The disks are removable and can be mounted on the axle in any order desired. The order of the disks is the cipher key, and both sender and receiver must arrange the disks in the same predefined order. Jefferson's device had 36 disks.

Once the disks have been placed on the axle in the agreed order, the sender rotates each disk up and down until a desired message is spelled out in one row. Then, the sender can copy down any row of text on the disks other than the one that contains the plaintext message. The recipient has to arrange the disks in the agreed-upon order, rotate the disks so they spell out the encrypted message on one row, and then look around the rows until they see the plaintext message, i.e. the row that's not unreadable. There is an extremely small chance that there will be two readable messages, but this can be easily avoided by checking.

The Jefferson disk was invented by Thomas Jefferson in 1795, and the same method was independently invented and improved upon by Commandant Etienne Bazeries, but did not become well known until he broke the Great Cipher, of Rossignols, a century after Jefferson's work. The system was used by the United States Army from 1923 until 1942 as the M-94. It aided the war efforts as it was a type of secret messaging that only military and government officials would know how to interpret.

Example of Operation 

To encrypt a message, the encrypter rotates the disks to produce the plaintext message along one "row" of the stack of disks, and then selects another row as the ciphertext. To decrypt the message, the decrypter rotates the disks on his cylinder to produce the ciphertext along a row. Decryption is easier if both the encrypter and the decrypter know the offset of the row, but not necessary since the decrypter can look around the cylinder to find a row that makes sense.

For example, a simplified "toy" Bazeries cylinder using only ten disks might be organized as shown below, with each disk "unwrapped" into a line and each marked with a designating number:

If the "key", the sequence of disks, for this Bazeries cylinder is
7,9,5,10,1,6,3,8,2,4
and the encrypter wants to send the message "" to the decrypter, the encrypter rearranges the disks as per the key and rotates each disk to obtain the plaintext, which is shown at the left, with spacing added for clarity:

the encrypter then selects the ciphertext from the sixth row of the cylinder up from the plaintext. This ciphertext is also highlighted above with spacing, and gives:

When the decrypter gets the ciphertext, they rearrange the disks on their cylinder to the key arrangement, rotate the disks to give the ciphertext, and then read the plaintext six rows down from the ciphertext, or look over the cylinder for a row that makes sense.

Basis for later military ciphers 

The Bazeries cylinder was the basis for the US "M-94" cipher machine, which was introduced in 1922 and derived from work by Parker Hitt. In 1914, Hitt had experimented with the Bazeries device, building one prototype using slides on a wooden frame, with the cipher alphabets printed twice consecutively on the slides, and then another using disks of wood. He forwarded his experiments up the Signal Corps chain of command, and in 1917 Joseph Mauborgne refined the scheme, with the final result being the M-94.

The M-94 used 25 aluminium disks on a spindle. It was used by the Army, Coast Guard, and the Radio Intelligence Division of the Federal Communications Commission until early in World War II. The Army changed back to Hitt's original slide scheme with the "M-138-A" cipher machine, which was introduced in the 1930s and was used by the US Navy and US State Department through World War II. The M-138-A featured 100 strips, with 30 selected for use in any one cipher session. It was an improvement in security for the State Department, which during the interwar years had used insecure codes, even in one case a standard commercial telegraph code.

Cryptanalysis 

The Bazeries cylinder was a relatively strong system at the time (compared to many other systems in use), and Etienne Bazeries, a French military cryptanalyst, is said to have regarded it as indecipherable. The "Pers Z S" code-breaking group of the German Foreign Office cracked the M-138-A in 1944. However, by that time the Americans had more sophisticated cipher systems in operation.

The French cryptographer Gaetan de Viaris (aka Marquis Gaetan Henri Leon Viarizio di Lesegno) who is famous for one of the first printing cipher devices (1874), solved the Bazeries cylinder in 1893.

One major weakness of the Bazeries cylinder is that the offset from the plaintext letter to the ciphertext letter for the cipher alphabet on each disk will be exactly the same. In the example shown above, this offset is six letters.

For example, if a cryptanalyst has captured the ten disk Bazeries cylinder described in the example above, this should not be enough to permit them to decipher messages with it, since they also have to know the key, or the arrangement of the disks on the cylinder. The number of possible permutations of the disks of the example Bazeries cylinder is:

Due to the large size of this number, trial and error testing of the arrangement of the disks difficult to perform by hand.

Sources 

 The Codebreakers, David Kahn, 1967, pp. 192–195
 "Monticello." Wheel Cipher. Accessed April 8, 2022. https://www.monticello.org/site/research-and-collections/wheel-cipher.
 Riverbank Publication Number 20, Several Machine Ciphers and Methods for their Solution, William F. Friedman, 1918, in Methods for the Solution of Ciphers, Publications 15-22, Rufus A. Long Digital Library of Cryptography, George C. Marshall Library, 1917-1922,
 "Rossignols." Wikipedia. Wikimedia Foundation, November 19, 2021. https://en.wikipedia.org/wiki/Rossignols.

External links 

 Thomas Jefferson's Wheel Cipher

American inventions
Encryption devices
Thomas Jefferson